The palmar digital veins (or volar digital veins) on each finger are connected to the dorsal digital veins by oblique intercapitular veins.

Some sources distinguish between the "proper palmar digital veins", which are more distal, and the "common palmar digital veins", which are more proximal.

References 

Veins of the upper limb